Project S-11 is a game developed by Paragon 5 and published by Sunsoft for the Game Boy Color. It was released in North America on January 3, 2001.

Gameplay

The game is played in a manner similar to a shoot 'em up arcade game. Players control the S-11 fighter, which can freely move across the top-down oriented screen. Waves of enemies come from the top of screen (and occasionally the side) which the player must attempt to destroy to gain points. Players can collect various power-ups, which will make their weapons stronger or give them an extra life. Players will fight a mini boss half-way through a level, and a larger boss at the end of each level.

Development
Project S-11 was developed by Paragon 5 and published by Sunsoft. The name was originally supposed to be a placeholder, with a contest being held to name it. Along with getting to name the game, the winner would appear in the game credits and received a cash prize of $200.

Reception

IGN praised the game for its lack of slowdown and for its excellent gameplay. GameSpot wrote of the game, "Project S-11 is about the best the GBC is going to see in terms of space shooters." Jonny Dimaline for Retro Gamer described the game as having better graphics than gameplay.

References

2001 video games
Game Boy Color games
Game Boy Color-only games
North America-exclusive video games
Paragon Five games
Scrolling shooters
Single-player video games
Sunsoft games
Video games developed in the United States
Video games scored by Jonne Valtonen